Dianne Brushett (October 11, 1942 – July 11, 2017) was a Canadian politician.

Education
She has her master's degree in Atlantic Canada Studies from St. Mary's University, and received her Canadian Securities license after leaving government in 1997.

Career
She co-founded and managed Dominion Biologicals Ltd. until 1990.

Political career
Brushett was a member of the Liberal Party of Canada and a former Member of Parliament in the House of Commons of Canada, representing the riding of Cumberland—Colchester from 1993 to 1997. She served as the Atlantic Regional Assistant Whip while in Parliament. Brushett ran again in the 2000 and 2004 federal elections, but was defeated both times. She previously served as the president of the Cumberland—Colchester—Musquodoboit Valley Liberal Association, ending in 2007.

Personal life
Brushett was divorced and had two children, Sean Brushett and Samara Brushett Richardson. She was a cancer survivor and lived in Truro, Nova Scotia.  She died there on July 11, 2017 at the age of 74, having been diagnosed with leukemia 14 months prior.

References 

 

1942 births
2017 deaths
Members of the House of Commons of Canada from Nova Scotia
Liberal Party of Canada MPs
People from Carleton County, New Brunswick
Women members of the House of Commons of Canada
Women in Nova Scotia politics